Kazuhisa (written: , ,  or ) is a masculine Japanese given name. Notable people with the name include:

, Japanese footballer
, Japanese video game developer
, Japanese footballer
, Japanese baseball player
, Japanese footballer
, Japanese baseball player
, Japanese footballer
, Japanese footballer
, Japanese baseball player
, Japanese guitarist
, Japanese boxer, kickboxer and mixed martial artist
, Japanese rower

See also
8582 Kazuhisa, a main-belt asteroid

Japanese masculine given names